Erdmann August of Brandenburg-Bayreuth (b. Bayreuth, 8 October 1615 – d. Hof, 6 February 1651), was a member of the House of Hohenzollern and Hereditary Margrave (German: Erbmarkgraf) of Brandenburg-Bayreuth.

He was the seventh of the nine children of Christian, Margrave of Brandenburg-Bayreuth by his wife, Marie of Prussia. In fact, he was the third-born son but the only one to survive into adulthood; his two older brothers Georg Frederick (b. and d. 1608) and Christian Ernst (b. 1613 – d. 1614) died long before his own birth.

In Ansbach on 8 December 1641, Erdmann August married the Margravine Sophie of Brandenburg-Ansbach, who was also his first cousin (daughter of Joachim Ernst, Margrave of Brandenburg-Ansbach, his father's brother). They had only one son:

Christian Ernst (b. Bayreuth, 6 August 1644 – d. Erlangen, 20 May 1712), who became Margrave of Brandenburg-Bayreuth.

Sophie died on 3 December 1646. Erdmann August himself died four years later, aged thirty-five, in the middle of the preparations of his wedding with Sophie Agnes of Mecklenburg-Schwerin. Because he predeceased his father, his son Christian Ernst succeeded as Margrave of Brandenburg-Bayreuth in 1655.

1615 births
1651 deaths
House of Hohenzollern
Heirs apparent who never acceded
Sons of monarchs